Propaganda is a Russian pop music group formed in 2001. During its career, the band released many singles, among them several becoming hits in Russia: "Melom" ("Мелом"), "Tak i byt" ("Так и быть"), "5 minut na liubov" ("5 минут на любовь"), "Yay-ya" ("Яй-я"), "Super Detka" ("Супер-Детка"), "Quanto Costa", "Znaesh'" ("Знаешь"), and "Podruga" ("Подруга"), which topped Russian music charts.

Members

Discography

Studio albums 
 2001 — "Детки"
 2003 — "Так и быть"
 2003 — "Кто-то играет в любовь…" (re-released "Так и быть")
 2004 — "Super Dетка"
 2006 — "Стихи в метро или Одни дома"
 2008 — "Ты мой парень"
 2011 — "Знаешь"
 2014 — "Фиолетовая пудра"
 2016 — "Золотой альбом"

Remix albums 
 2002 — "Не дети"

Compilation albums 
 2002 — "Кто?!"
 2012 — "Лучшие песни"
 2015 — "Top 30"
 2018 — "Девочка хочет секса"
 2022 — "Новое и лучшее»

Mini-albums and maxi-singles 
 2011 — "Знаешь" (mini version)
 2011 — "До Луны на метро (Remixes)"
 2011 — "Я такая (Remixes)"
 2013 — "Подруга" (digital)

Singles 
 2001 — "Мелом"
 2002 — "Никто"
 2002 — "Холодно"
 2002 — "Кто?"
 2003 — "5 минут на любовь"
 2003 — "Так и быть"
 2003 — "Дождь по крышам"
 2003 — "Песня без слов..."
 2003 — "Яй-я"
 2004 — "Super dетка"
 2004 — "Quanto costa"
 2006 — "Стихи в метро"
 2006 — "Скучаю"
 2007 — "Ёлки-палки"
 2008 — "Непростой"
 2009 — "Он меня провожал"
 2013 — "Подруга"
 2013 — "Я написала любовь"
 2013 — "Банальная история" (with Master Spensor)
 2013 — "Папа, ты прав"
 2014 — "Жаль"
 2015 — "Волшебство"
 2015 — "Супер детка (2016)"
 2015 — "Пять минут на любовь (Remix 2016)"
 2015 — "Я ухожу от тебя" (with Tres)
 2016 — "Наша песня"
 2016 — "Ты – моя невесомость"
 2016 — "Сэлфи с войны"
 2016 — "Мяу"
 2016 — "Забываю"
 2016 — "Я тебя забываю"
 2017 — "Не такая я"
 2017 — "Сильно люблю тебя"
 2017 — "Танцуй, моя Москва"
 2018 — "Научил любить"
 2018 — "Белый дым"
 2019 — "Сверхновая"
 2019 — "Белое платье"
 2019 — "Не Алёнка"
 2020 — "Я твоя девочка"

Unreleased tracks 
 "Далеко ли до Таллина" (2003) — V. Voronina, O. Moreva, E. Oleinikova (with band "Горячие головы")
 "Funny Mix" (2004) — V. Voronina, O. Moreva, I. Yakovleva
 "Мари полюбила Хуана" (2004) — V. Voronina, O. Moreva, I. Yakovleva, D. Gavrilchuk
 "Mega Mix" (2005) — V. Voronina, O. Moreva, I. Yakovleva, D. Gavrilchuk
 "Just like you" ("Melom" English version) (2007) — V. Voronina, I. Yakovleva, M. Bucatari
 "Капкан" (2009) — V. Voronina, M. Bucatari, A. Shevchenko
 "Горностай!" ("Gangnam Style" Russian cover) (2012) — M. Bucatari, A. Shevchenko (feat. DJ Yankovski)
 "Украина, Россия с тобой!" (2014) — M. Bucatari, A. Shevchenko

Videos

Accolades 
 2003 — "Top League" ("Высшая лига") for the performance with band "Горячие головы" "Daleko li do Tallina"
 2003 and 2005 — "Boom of the Year / Bomb of the Year" ("Бум года / Бомба года")
 2003 — the song "Tak i byt" was nominated at "Pesnya goda"
 2003 and 2004 — "100% hit" ("Стопудовый хит")
 2004 — the song "Quanto costa" won the award at "Pesnya goda"
 2004 — Golden Gramophone Award for the song "Yay-ya" ("Яй-я"); "Golden Gramophone Award in Saint Petersburg" for the song "Super detka"
 2004 — "Superdisc / Silver disc" ("Супердиск / Серебряный диск") for the album "Super detka"
 2005 — the song "Govorila ne liubliu" was nominated at "Pesnya goda"
 2008 — "Golden Gramophone Award in Kazakhstan" for the song "Neprostoy"

References

External links
 Propaganda at promodj
 Propaganda on instagram
 Propaganda on youtube
 Propaganda on moskva.fm 

Russian girl groups
Musical groups established in 2001
Synthpop groups